Tirathaba acyperella is a species of moth of the family Pyralidae described by George Hampson in 1901. It is found on the D'Entrecasteaux Islands.

References 

Tirathabini
Moths described in 1901